Tyler Marshall Harvey (born 29 June 1995) is an English professional footballer who plays as a midfielder and a forward for Truro City. Born in Plymouth, he made his debut in the Football League in 2012.

Playing career
Harvey joined Plymouth Argyle's Centre of Excellence in July 2004, at the age of nine. Aged 17 at the start of the 2012–13 season, his goal record for the youth side brought him to the attention of manager Carl Fletcher, as well as bigger clubs. He made his first team debut on 20 November 2012, in a 1–0 defeat to Bradford City at Valley Parade, after coming on for Paris Cowan-Hall after 74 minutes. He scored his first goal on his first start in a 1–1 boxing day draw with Torquay United at Home Park. In November 2013, Harvey joined Salisbury City on a youth loan until January 2014. He scored once in 4 games for Salisbury, the goal coming in a 3–1 win over Woking. His only goal of the 2013–14 season for Argyle was a header in a 2–1 win over Newport County.

On 16 August 2014, Harvey scored his first goal of the 14–15 season, a free kick in the Devon Derby against Exeter City.

In February 2016, Harvey joined Bath City on a 3-month loan deal from Plymouth, under new manager Gary Owers

On 11 April 2016, having scored 4 goals in 5 games for Bath, including a brace against Weston-Super-Mare, Harvey was recalled to Plymouth for the remainder of the season due to injury to Reuben Reid. On 7 May 2016, Harvey scored brace on the last day of the season in the 5–0 win against Hartlepool United.

On 28 July 2016, Harvey joined Wrexham on a one-year deal after rejecting a contract extension at Plymouth. He made his debut for the club on the opening day of the 2016–17 season, in a 0–0 draw with Dover Athletic. In November 2016, Harvey rejoined Bath City on an initial two-month loan spell. He returned to Wrexham in January 2017 but was released by the club after his contract was cancelled. Following his release, Harvey entered talks with Bath over returning to the club on a permanent deal but eventually joined National League South rivals Truro City.

In June 2019, Harvey returned to Bath City on a permanent transfer.

Career statistics

References

External links

1995 births
Living people
Footballers from Plymouth, Devon
English footballers
Association football forwards
Plymouth Argyle F.C. players
Salisbury City F.C. players
Bath City F.C. players
Wrexham A.F.C. players
Truro City F.C. players
English Football League players